German submarine U-1107 was a Type VIIC/41 U-boat built for Nazi Germany's Kriegsmarine for service during World War II.
She was laid down on 20 August 1943 by Nordseewerke, Emden as yard number 229, launched on 30 June 1944 and commissioned on 8 August 1944 under Oberleutnant zur See Fritz Parduhn.

Design
Like all Type VIIC/41 U-boats, U-1107 had a displacement of  when at the surface and  while submerged.

U-1107 was fitted with five  torpedo tubes (four fitted at the bow and one at the stern), fourteen torpedoes or 26 TMA or TMB Naval mines, one  SK C/35 naval gun, (220 rounds), one  Flak M42 and two  C/30 anti-aircraft guns. Its complement was between forty-four and sixty.

Service history
The boat's career began with training at 8th U-boat Flotilla on 8 August 1944, followed by active service on 16 February 1945 as part of the 11th Flotilla for the remainder of her service.

Fate
U-1107 was sunk on 30 April 1945 in the Bay of Biscay west of Brest, in position  by a homing torpedo from a US Navy Liberator of VP-103. All hands lost

Previously recorded fate
U-1107 was sunk on 30 April 1945 in the Bay of Biscay in position , by bombs from US Navy Catalina 'R' of VPB-63, flown by Lt F.G. Lake. The aircraft was flying a MAD Rover patrol, and dropped 24 bombs when the craft was detected. 37 crew were killed with an unknown number of survivors.

Summary of raiding history

See also
 Battle of the Atlantic (1939-1945)

References

Bibliography

External links

German Type VIIC/41 submarines
1944 ships
U-boats commissioned in 1944
U-boats sunk in 1945
U-boats sunk by US aircraft
World War II shipwrecks in the Atlantic Ocean
World War II submarines of Germany
Ships built in Emden
Maritime incidents in April 1945